Bandar Ainsdale is a new township in Seremban, Negeri Sembilan, Malaysia. This township is located near between Seremban 2 and Labu. It is served by the North–South Expressway Southern Route and KTM Komuter.

Transportation

Car
North–South Expressway Southern Route, 217 serves Bandar Ainsdale. Bandar Ainsdale is mostly served by Jalan Labu Federal Route 362 which connects Bandar Ainsdale to Seremban, Labu, and Nilai.

Rail
Bandar Ainsdale is served by Tiroi Komuter station on the KTM Komuter Seremban Line and is just a 5 minute drive from the township.

References 

Geography of Negeri Sembilan